Germakochi is a forest man who appears in the mythology of the Laz people. Ochokochi of Georgian mythology considered equivalent to Germakochi. In ancient times, Laz people would leave their villages if they feel that Germakochi is in the village.

Description 
Germakochi is a tall and hairy figure who lives in the forests. It looks like something between a monkey and a human. Germakochi is a curious character and likes to interact with humans. The way to escape from Germakochi is to make a fire. Germakochi takes the fire and burns instantly. Then, he would run to Black Sea and jumps into it. Figure is also similar to Kallikantzaros of Anatolian folklore.

Etymology 
In Laz language, germa means "mountain" and kochi means "man". Therefore, meaning of Germakochi is "man of the mountain".

References 

Laz mythology
Legendary creatures
Kallikantzaros